The Progressive Conservative Party of New Brunswick held a leadership election in 1989 to replace its former leader Richard Hatfield who had led the party to lose all of its seats in the 1987 election after 17 years in power.  The winner was Fredericton lawyer Barbara Baird Filliter, the first woman to lead a Conservative party in Canada.

The candidates were Baird Filliter and former Kings East member of the legislative assembly Hazen Myers.

Results

References 

1989 elections in Canada
Progressive Conservative Party of New Brunswick leadership elections
1989 in New Brunswick
Progressive Conservative Party of New Brunswick leadership election